The Norwegian National Road Race Championships, have been held annually with an event for each category of rider; Men, Women, junior riders & under 23 riders, since 1946. The event also includes the Norwegian National Time Trial Championships and the Norwegian National Criterium Championships.

The winners of each event are awarded with a symbolic cycling jersey featuring the Norwegian flag on the chest, which can be worn by the rider at other road racing events in the country to show their status as national champion. The champion's stripes can be combined into a sponsored rider's team kit design for this purpose.

Men

Elite

Under 23

Junior

Women

Criterium Championships

See also
Norwegian National Time Trial Championships
National road cycling championships

References

External links
List of winners between 1912–2007 at Sykling.no
Results at CycleBase.nl
Results at CyclingArchives.com

Cycle races in Norway
National road cycling championships
National championships in Norway